Francis Lear (1823–1914) was an  Anglican priest: the Archdeacon of Sarum from 1875 until his death.

Born on 23 August 1823, son of Francis Lear, Dean of Salisbury, he was educated at Winchester and Christ Church, Oxford. Lear made four appearances in first-class cricket in 1843 and 1844, playing for the Marylebone Cricket Club and Oxford University. He was ordained in 1847 and served first as a curate at Bishopstone. He became its Vicar in 1850 and Rural Dean of Chalke in 1852. From 1864 to 1875 he was Precentor of Salisbury Cathedral. He died on 19 February 1914.

References

1823 births
People educated at Winchester College
Alumni of Christ Church, Oxford
Archdeacons of Sarum
1914 deaths
English cricketers
Marylebone Cricket Club cricketers
Oxford University cricketers